Sabadabadog! is a 2011 Philippine television informative children's show broadcast by GMA Network. Hosted by Pia Arcangel, Tonipet Gaba and Arkin Magalona, it premiered on May 21, 2011. The show concluded on November 19, 2011 with a total of 27 episodes.

Segment
Balitang Sabadabadog!
Bebe GaruMania
Special Sabado Report
Da Who!

Mascots
Sabadabadog, a dog who is a Bebe Garu's friend. He also learn to break the fourth wall.
Don Kahon, a box friend of Sabadabadog. He can find some of junks that he and Sabadabadog find.
Mei-Mei, a girlfriend of Sabadabadog and it's precisely a cellphone shaped mascot. Sometimes she can learn technologies of success.
Bebe Garu, Sabadabadog's helper she can tell something else about something. Like Sabadabadog, she and her dog can learn some success.

Ratings
According to AGB Nielsen Philippines' Mega Manila household television ratings, the final episode of Sabadabadog! scored a 4.6% rating.

References

External links
 

2011 Philippine television series debuts
2011 Philippine television series endings
Filipino-language television shows
GMA Network original programming
GMA Integrated News and Public Affairs shows
Philippine children's television series